Ryan McGee is a senior writer for ESPN The Magazine and formerly a television producer with ESPN, Fox Sports Net, and NASCAR Media Group. He covers a variety of American sports, but is best known for his motorsports work, particularly NASCAR, and college football. Before joining ESPN The Magazine he was a columnist for FoxSports.com. He was also editor-in-chief at NASCAR Media and wrote the script for the documentary Dale, that was narrated by Paul Newman.

In 2006 he published his first book, ESPN Ultimate NASCAR: 100 Defining Moments in Stock Car Racing History and his second, The Road To Omaha: Hits, Hopes, and History at the College World Series which was published in May 2009. The paperback version was published in May 2010. In 2018, he co-authored the Dale Earnhardt Jr. book and New York Times bestseller "Racing to the Finish." In 2020 he co-authored "Sidelines and Bloodlines" with father Dr. Jerry McGee and brother Sam McGee about Dr. McGee's longtime career as a college football official. 

McGee was also an analyst/contributor to ESPN2's night studio show NASCAR Now before the show was canceled in early 2014. He is currently a commentator on ESPNU and the SEC Network, where he frequently guest hosts on The Paul Finebaum Show.

McGee co-hosts Marty & McGee alongside Marty Smith. In 2015 the podcast was promoted to a regular weekend time slot on ESPN Radio and in 2018 a TV version of the show began on the SEC Network.

McGee also writes a column for ESPN.com called the Bottom 10, where he ranks and explains the ten worst teams in College Football. The column is updated weekly.

See also
Totally NASCAR

References

External links

Living people
American sportswriters
ESPN people
Year of birth missing (living people)